The Gazebo is the title of a 1959 film.

The Gazebo may also refer to

 The Gazebo (play), the 1958 play from which the film was adapted
 The Gazebo (painting), an 1818 painting by Caspar David Friedrich
 The Gazebo (book), a 2008 autobiography of Alexander Lebenstein

See also
 Gazebo (disambiguation)